Shite-hawk (also spelled shitehawk) or shit-hawk or shitty hawk is a slang name applied to various birds of prey that exhibit scavenging behaviour, originally and primarily the black kite, although the term has also been applied to other birds such as the herring gull.  It is also a slang derogatory term for an unpleasant person.

Origin of the term
The term "shite-hawk" is believed to have originated as military slang by the British Army in India and Egypt, as a derogatory term for the black kite (Milvus migrans), which was despised by soldiers for its habit of stealing food from their plates:

Eric Partridge, an etymologist, claimed that the term was used to refer to the vulture by the soldiers in the British Army in India during the period 1870–1947, although the earliest recorded use of the term in print in the Oxford English Dictionary is 1944.  In recent years, in the United Kingdom, the term "shite-hawk" has also been applied to the herring gull (Larus argentatus), which is known for its mobbing and scavenging behaviour.

Referring to the red kite
Although "shite-hawk" originally referred to the black kite in India and elsewhere, and British naturalists Mark Cocker and Richard Mabey explicitly note that the "red kite never suffered the indignity of its relative's nickname", in recent years, following the successful reintroduction of the red kite into Scotland and England during the 1990s, the term has also started to be used for the red kite in Britain, apparently due to confusion between the two species of kite.  Thus, in 1999, Lord Burton announced in the House of Lords that "[p]ossibly one of the most highly protected birds today is the [red] kite, known by the British Army throughout the world as a shite-hawk".

In March 2011, BBC Radio 4 broadcast a radio programme called The Kestrel and Red Kite, in which presenter Rod Liddle repeatedly asserted that the red kite (Milvus milvus) was historically known as the shite-hawk in England.  However, he provided no evidence for this assertion, and the only other references to the red kite being called a shite-hawk in medieval times are very recent, for example a historical novel published in 2011 (but set in 1513), and in a poem written by Christopher Hodgson (published 2005):

And in Medieval times, with waste piled publicly,
Its habit of scavenging in sewage
Earned it the sobriquet, "Shite hawk" — Red Kite by Christopher Hodgson

Other uses
The name was used in the television series Trailer Park Boys by character Jim Lahey, who is known for using metaphors with the slang "shit". The character used the slang again in the Trailer Park Boys film.
Military badges depicting birds of prey are also sometimes referred to as shite-hawks.  Examples include the eagle badge on the sleeves of the 4th Indian Division of the British Indian Army, and the eagle on the left breast pocket of members of Pathfinder squadrons in the Royal Air Force.
The term "shitehawk" has also been used as a derogatory term for an offensive or unpleasant person, equivalent to the word "shit".  For example: in 1997, the band Half Man Half Biscuit described the driver of a car parked on the pavement as "a thoughtless shitehawk" in the song He who would Valium take on their album Voyage to the Bottom of the Road.
Charlie Brooker used the term in an episode of Newswipe when referring to an American news anchor who patronised Susan Boyle. He was referring to the anchor saying the word "gobsmacked" was one of her "favourite British words".
The Senior Rates’ mess at RNAS Culdrose is called the Shy Talk Inn.
In the BBC series Steptoe and Son, Harold uses the phrases "more meat on a Bombay shitehawk" referring to Albert's emaciated appearance, and "eyes like a shitehawk".

Footnotes

Slang